is a Japanese actress and voice actress who works for Gekidan Subaru. Yuya is originally from Nagasaki. She voices Jill Valentine in the Resident Evil series and officer Miwako Sato in the long-running anime series Case Closed. She is the official Japanese voice dub-over artist for actresses Angelina Jolie and Natasha Henstridge.

Filmography

Anime

Film

Video games

Drama CD

Tokusatsu

Dubbing

References

External links
 Official agency profile 
 
 

1968 births
Living people
Voice actresses from Nagasaki Prefecture
Japanese video game actresses
Japanese voice actresses
20th-century Japanese actresses
21st-century Japanese actresses